A Certification Practice Statement (CPS) is a document from a certificate authority or a member of a web of trust which describes their practice for issuing and managing public key certificates.

Some elements of a CPS include documenting practices of:
 issuance
 publication
 archiving
 revocation
 renewal

By detailing the practice of issuance, revocation and renewal, a CPS aids entities in judging the relative reliability of a given certificate authority.

Certificate authorities 

In a certificate authority, the CPS should derive from the organization's certificate policy and may be referenced in issued certificates.

Web of trust

Because individuals act as certifiers in a web of trust, individual CPS documents are sometimes used.  For example, in a PGP WoT, the CPS might state that the certifying entity checked two forms of legal government ID before signing the person's public key.

Digital signatures 

When verifying digital signatures, it's necessary to review the CPS so as to determine the meaning of the issuance of the certificate by the certifying entity.

References

External links 
 Microsoft.com "Creating Certificate Policies and Certificate Practice Statements"
 Security policy
 Example of a CPS for a Web of Trust: http://www.grep.be/gpg/cert-policy-v2

Key management
Public-key cryptography